Dover-Eyota High School is a Public high school located in Eyota, Minnesota. As of 2021, Dover-Eyota High School has approximately 600 students.

Athletics
In the fall of 2003 Dover-Eyota High School opened a new gym with a large mural of a bald eagle on the east side.

Dover-Eyota State Team Participants
 Football (1993,1998, 2000)
 Baseball (2000)
 Boys Basketball (2006)
 Wrestling (1993, 2007)
 Girls Cross-Country (2010–3rd, 2012–5th, 2013–11th, 2014–11th)
Girls Soccer (2016, 2015, 2014)
 Girls Basketball (2015-Class 2A State Champions)
Dance (2012– 11th in high kick), (2014– High Kick and Jazz), (2013– High Kick-12th place) (2007– High Kick and Jazz)

Arts
The Dover Eyota High School Band was ranked named a Grammy Signature School Semi-Finalist in 2012 and 2013.

In 2020, the 2019–2020 Dover Eyota High School Concert Band selected to perform at the Minnesota Music Educators Association (MMEA) Midwinter Clinic.

Notable alumni
Logan Clark, professional mixed martial artist and college football player for Hamline University.

References

External links
Dover-Eyota High School web page
Eagle newspaper

Educational institutions established in 1961
Public high schools in Minnesota
Schools in Olmsted County, Minnesota
1961 establishments in Minnesota